Keith Douglas Washington (born November 15, 1960) is an American R&B vocalist from Detroit who recorded the hit single "Kissing You" in 1991. The song was also used as background music for the ABC television soap opera General Hospital. "Kissing You" was nominated for a Grammy Award for Best R&B Vocal Performance Male and won a 1992 Soul Train Music Award for Best R&B/Soul Single – Male. The song also topped the Billboard Hot R&B/Hip-Hop Songs chart for one week. .

Biography
Prior to his success as a recording act, Washington earned recognition as a songwriter, co-writing Freddie Jackson's 1988 number one R&B hit "Hey Lover".  Within three years, Washington had scored a contract as a solo artist, releasing his debut album, Make Time for Love, in 1991. In addition to "Kissing You", the album featured a number of successful follow-up R&B singles.  He also recorded a duet with Kylie Minogue, their co-composition "If You Were with Me Now", in 1991 (on PWL Records), which reached number 4 in the UK Singles Chart and number 23 in Minogue's native Australia.  Washington's follow-up album, You Make It Easy appeared in 1993, though its success paled in comparison to the debut.  It would be another five years before Washington released his third album, KW, which featured the minor single, "Bring It On".

Washington branched out in a few acting roles, starring as himself on the television series Martin in an episode called "A Woman with a Past" which featured him singing a duet with Tisha Campbell-Martin titled "The Closer I Get to You", a classic ballad performed and made famous in 1978 by Roberta Flack and Donny Hathaway. Additionally, Keith had a brief role in the TV soap opera General Hospital as Keith Jasper. Appearing alongside lead actress Janet Jackson, he  also had a brief role in John Singleton's Poetic Justice, as a hairdresser named Dexter.

Washington's first marriage to Marsha Jenkins ended in divorce and resulted in her writing The Other Side of Through, a book loosely based on Jenkins' marriage to Washington and her experiences with the singer's marital infidelities. In June 2009, Washington married his longtime girlfriend, Stephanie Grimes, who is general sales manager for WGPR-FM 107.5 in Detroit. He also revealed his plans to release a new album. Washington has since branched out into radio himself, as he now hosts the nighttime "Slow Jams" show "Kisses After Dark" on Detroit radio station WDMK-FM 105.9 (Kiss-FM).

Discography

Studio albums

Singles

References

External links
 Discography at Discogs.

Living people
1960 births
African-American singer-songwriters
Qwest Records artists
American contemporary R&B singers
Singers from Detroit
Ballad musicians
20th-century African-American male singers